Red Bank is an unincorporated community on the west edge of Evansville in Perry Township, Vanderburgh County, in the U.S. state of Indiana.

Features
The community is bordered to the south by Broadway Avenue and Middle Mount Vernon Road. To the east lies the Carpentier Creek. The majority of the housing is centered on Bosse and Claremont. Several shopping centers are in the area, offering a wide variety of restaurants and shopping outlets, including two supermarkets and a major Wal-Mart outlet. This area is arguably one of the most diverse shopping centers in Evansville.

Red Bank Road, one of the main roads in the community, is rumored to be the oldest road within the city limits of Evansville..

The Lloyd Expressway passes through just north of the community, giving direct access to Indiana State Road 62.

Mud Center
While the nearby community of Mud Center is more frequently included on maps than Red Bank, it is usually referred to by locals as part of Red Bank (the name "Mud Center" is virtually unknown to locals), even though it is a separate community.

Geography

References

Communities of Southwestern Indiana
Unincorporated communities in Vanderburgh County, Indiana
Unincorporated communities in Indiana